San Diego is a town and municipality in the Colombian Department of Cesar.  It was founded on 19 July 1609.

References

External links
 San Diego official website
 Gobernacion del Cesar, San Diego

Municipalities of Cesar Department
Populated places established in 1609
1609 establishments in the Spanish Empire